Wilmer Ruperti (born December 7, 1959) is a Venezuelan-born shipping business magnate. Since 2003, he has captured a major share of the market in physically exporting oil from Venezuela to the rest of Latin America, and has become one of Venezuela's wealthiest persons.

Lloyd's List International described Ruperti in 2004 as a man who transformed himself from a shipping master into a leading player in Venezuela's billion-dollar oil business, and that “everything Wilmer Ruperti touches appears to turn to gold”.

Career
Ruperti's career began in 1987 as a tanker master for Venezuelan oil company, Maraven, S.A., an industry affiliate of Venezuela's state-owned oil company, Petróleos de Venezuela, S.A. (PDVSA). He later studied shipping in Plymouth, England, before returning to Caracas, Venezuela, to set up his own small shipbroking firm.

PDVSA strike
Ruperti's big break in the shipping business came in late 2002 when he shipped gasoline to Venezuelan ports, using tankers chartered from Russia, during the Venezuelan general strike of 2002–2003, which featured a strike by thousands of employees at PDVSA.

The strike by PDVSA staff severely reduced oil production and exports, and cut domestic fuel supplies before it failed. As a result of his successful shipping arrangements, Ruperti was able to consolidate his business relationship with PDVSA and the government. Although his business acumen earned him the disdain of the PDVSA employees who went on strike and were later dismissed, Chávez decorated Ruperti with the Star of Carabobo, a Venezuelan medallion usually awarded to military officers for distinguished service.

Shipping company
Ruperti's ship-owning company, Suramericana de Transportes de Petróleo, owns a fleet of oil tankers and other vessels, and his ship management business is called Global Ship Management. Ruperti has become deeply involved in Chávez's policy of shipping discounted oil to Argentina and numerous countries in the Caribbean. The Venezuelan business news portal Descifrado.com reported in June 2006 that Ruperti was setting up a maritime investment fund, and was planning to raise $500m for the construction of eight new oil tankers.

Recent business expansion
Ruperti has recently moved into other areas of business. He owns a private television channel in Venezuela called Canal i, formerly called Puma TV.

Personal life
In December 2006, The Wall Street Journal profiled Ruperti, who is of Italian ancestry, and quoted him as saying that he supported Chávez because he is 
“the only person who has identified himself with the poor”.
The article also described Ruperti's lifestyle, noting that he has two South Korean bodyguards, moves around Caracas in a bullet-proof BMW, owns a private jet, and in 2005 sponsored a charity concert held in Caracas by Luciano Pavarotti. Ruperti is a keen golfer and has set up a youth golf school in Caracas.

At an unreported date, Ruperti bought two gold-plated Napoleonic-era pistols which were once owned by Simón Bolívar, the Venezuelan-born Latin American 19th century independence leader, at an auction in New York, for $1.6m. It was later reported that he planned to donate the pistols to the Venezuelan government, but Ruperti denied this in his Wall Street Journal interview, saying he would leave them to his children. However, Venezuelan President, Hugo Chávez Frías confirmed that he received the pistols in national TV in July 2011. In said video, President Chávez states clearly that Ruperti "donated" the pistols.

On 11 October 2016, Ruperti is said to have paid for the legal defence of two people accused of trying to smuggle cocaine to the United States from Haiti: Efraín Antonio Campo Flores and Franqui Francisco Flores de Freitas, both nephews of the Venezuelan first lady Cilia Flores, wife of President Nicolas Maduro, Efraín and Franqui are represented by Randall W. Jackson, John T. Zach, Joanna Wright of the legal firm Boies, Schiller & Flexner LLP; and David M. Rody, Michael D. Mann, Elizabeth Espinosa, from Sidley Austin LLP; all who have confirmed that he is the person paying for the defence of the two suspected drug traffickers.

References

External links
 
 Channel I
 
 Perfil de Wilmer Ruperti

1960 births
Living people
Venezuelan billionaires
Venezuelan businesspeople
Venezuelan television company founders
Businesspeople in shipping
Venezuelan people of Italian descent